Sean O'Regan is the current head coach of the James Madison University women's basketball team.

Career
Coach O'Regan previously served as associate head coach for nine years.  He is an alumnus of James Madison and was a student manager of the Men's basketball team before graduating in 2003.

Head Coaching Record

References

Basketball coaches
1980 births
Living people
James Madison Dukes women's basketball coaches
Evansville Purple Aces men's basketball coaches
Basketball coaches from Vermont
People from Montpelier, Vermont